The Unknown Confederate Dead Monument in Perryville is located in the vicinity of Perryville, in Boyle County, Kentucky, United States, in the Goodknight Cemetery, a small family cemetery on private land.  It is presumed to have been constructed around the year 1928, sixty-six years after the Battle of Perryville on October 8, 1862, in which the Confederate soldiers buried here anonymously died.  In total, 532 Confederates died at the battle, but it is unknown how many of this number are buried here.

The headstone is approximately seven feet (2.1 m) tall, and is made up of a marble and granite composite. Despite being on private property, it was the federal government that erected the monument.

On July 17, 1997, the Unknown Confederate Dead Monument in Perryville was one of sixty different monuments related to the Civil War in Kentucky placed on the National Register of Historic Places, as part of the Civil War Monuments of Kentucky Multiple Property Submission. Three other monuments on this Multiple Property Submission are also in Boyle County.  Two of them are in the nearby Perryville Battlefield State Historic Site by the visitor center: the Confederate Monument in Perryville and the Union Monument in Perryville.  The other is in downtown Danville: the Confederate Monument in Danville.  Many of the other memorials in graveyards have numerous unknown soldiers, but this is the only one which has no soldiers with known names.

References

External links
 

Civil War Monuments of Kentucky MPS
National Register of Historic Places in Boyle County, Kentucky
Confederate States of America monuments and memorials in Kentucky
1928 sculptures
1928 establishments in Kentucky
Marble sculptures in Kentucky
Granite sculptures in Kentucky
Tombs of Unknown Soldiers